Daniel Ryan Keatings (born 4 January 1990) is a retired British artistic gymnast representing Scotland and Great Britain. Both an all-around gymnast and a specialist pommel horse worker, Keatings was the first male British gymnast to medal at the all-around competition at the World Championships, and the first male British gymnast to become a European champion, winning on pommel horse, his signature piece, in 2010 in Birmingham and again in 2013 in Moscow. In 2014, he won gold at the Commonwealth Games, again in pommel horse, for Scotland. With Louis Smith, Max Whitlock and Joe Fraser of England and Great Britain, and Rhys McClenaghan of Northern Ireland and Ireland, Keatings formed part of a golden generation of home nations pommel horse workers who dominated the apparatus at global, continental and Commonwealth Games level from 2010 onwards.

Career
Keatings represented Scotland at the 2006 Commonwealth Games and Great Britain at the 2007 World Artistic Gymnastics Championships, 2009 World Artistic Gymnastics Championships, 2011 World Artistic Gymnastics Championships and the 2008 Summer Olympics.

In April 2009, Keatings won the all-around silver medal in the European Gymnastics Championships in Milan. He also won the bronze medal in the pommel horse final. In September 2009 Keatings gained a sponsorship deal with business power supplier Opus Energy. The company agreed to cover his competition fees, equipment, and travel costs. During the same year, Daniel also became an official ambassador for premium sports nutrition brand Maximuscle.

On 15 October 2009, Keatings made history when he became the first British gymnast to win a medal in the all-around event at the Artistic World Championships. The event, which was held at the O2 Arena in London, saw Keatings rise to the occasion and record a score of 88.925, taking the silver medal in front of the home crowd.

On 25 April 2010, Keatings made history again when he won Great Britain's first-ever Senior European Championship gold medal on the pommel horse the day after he helped Great Britain to win a historic silver medal in the team competition (their previous highest finish was 9th in 2008).

Returning from an injury, he made a comeback at the 2011 World Artistic Gymnastics Championships in Tokyo. He did not have a good competition in the preliminary rounds, including a fall off the pommel horse and a particularly nasty fall on high bar. He was not the only one of the British men's team to falter, and the team did not qualify through to the team final, finishing in 10th place. In addition, Keatings failed to qualify through to any of the individual event finals.

On 25 March 2012, Daniel competed at the Turnier der Meister FIG Challenge Cup C III Apparatus, Cottbus, Germany. After exceeding all expectations, Daniel reached the final and held his nerve, producing a quality routine that scored 15.775 for the silver medal, just over a tenth of a mark behind the Olympic champion, Xiao Qin of China.

Keatings again represented Scotland at the 2014 Commonwealth Games in Glasgow. As part of the Scottish team, he won a silver medal in the team competition on 29 July 2014 and followed this with another silver in the individual all-around final on 30 July. Keatings won gold in the pommel horse final on 31 July with a score of 16.058.

References

External links
 
 Daniel Keatings at British Gymnastics 
 Paul Hall Beijing blog
 Keating's Website
 Daniel Keatings blog
 Daniel Keatings Official Sponsors
 Daniel Keatings Video Interview on Maximuscle
 tdmcottbus.html Turnier der Meister FIG Challenge Cup results

1990 births
Living people
Medalists at the World Artistic Gymnastics Championships
British male artistic gymnasts
Olympic gymnasts of Great Britain
Gymnasts at the 2008 Summer Olympics
Commonwealth Games gold medallists for Scotland
Commonwealth Games silver medallists for Scotland
Commonwealth Games medallists in gymnastics
Gymnasts at the 2006 Commonwealth Games
Gymnasts at the 2014 Commonwealth Games
Medallists at the 2014 Commonwealth Games